Pluckley railway station is on the South Eastern Main Line in England, serving the village of Pluckley, Kent, which is approximately  to the north. It is  down the line from London Charing Cross. The station and all trains that serve the station are operated by Southeastern.

Facilities
The station features staggered platforms, whereby the 'up' (London-bound) platform is mostly west of the eastbound platform (on which the station buildings are situated). A footbridge links the platforms.

The ticket office is staffed only part-time; at other times a ticket vending machine is available.

History
The first train passed through the station on this date at 12.05pm to cheers from the local crowd. It was originally built to serve Pluckley Brick & Tile Works to the west of the station, and subsequently used as a freight depot for the Southwark Manure Company, transporting horse manure from London to use on Kent farms.

Goods services closed on 20 September 1965, and the signal box was taken out of service on 17 December 1967. The station buildings have mostly survived unaltered from their original construction.

Services 
All services at Pluckley are operated by Southeastern using  EMUs.

The typical off-peak service in trains per hour is:

 1 tph to London Charing Cross
 1 tph to  via 

There are also additional services to and from London Cannon Street.

References 
Citations

Sources

External links 

Railway stations in Kent
DfT Category E stations
Transport in the Borough of Ashford
Former South Eastern Railway (UK) stations
Railway stations in Great Britain opened in 1842
Railway stations served by Southeastern